Morris Almond (born February 2, 1985) is an American former professional basketball player. Almond is the founder of Almond Athletics. His last professional appearance would be for the Los Angeles D-Fenders of the NBA Development League (D-League).

High school
Almond was born in Dalton, Georgia and attended McEachern High School in Powder Springs, Georgia, where he was a teammate of fellow professional basketball player Josh Smith. Almond was the first basketball player in McEachern school history to have his #22 jersey retired.

College career
Almond played college basketball at Rice University, where he was a member of Martel residential college.  During his junior season, Almond's scoring average jumped to 21.9 points per game (up from 7.2 points per game as a sophomore).  His scoring average led all players in Conference USA.

During his senior year, Almond's scoring average increased to 26.4 points per game, ranking third in the nation. He was named Conference USA Player of the Year and was named AP All-America Honorable Mention.

Almond finished his career at Rice with 121 games played and a scoring average of 15.1 points per game. He was also the first Rice basketball player to appear on the cover of a national publication. After graduation, he was selected by the Utah Jazz in the first round (25th pick) in the 2007 NBA Draft.

Professional career
Almond played in 9 games during his rookie season with the Jazz, averaging 4.3 minutes. His NBA career high is currently 12 points, at Sacramento on December 2, 2008. He scored his first NBA points on January 8, 2008 against the Indiana Pacers, with 2 points on 1-of-5 shooting. However, he spent most of the season with the team's D-League affiliate, the Utah Flash, to whom he was assigned.  He led the D-League in scoring during the season, averaging 25.6 points per game. In just his fifth game with the team on December 21, 2007, he tied a league record with 51 points in a 118–116 victory over the Austin Toros. Later in the season, he broke the record with a 53-point performance against the Bakersfield Jam in a 102–87 win. The record was tied by Will Conroy in 2009 and surpassed by Pierre Jackson in 2014 (58).

On September 18, 2009, Morris Almond signed with the Orlando Magic. He was waived on October 21, 2009. Almond later played for the Maine Red Claws and Springfield Armor of the NBA Development League. He then signed with Real Madrid Baloncesto of the Spanish ACB. In July 2010 he left Real Madrid and joined the Italian club Scavolini Pesaro.

In January 2012, Almond returned to the United States and signed with the Maine Red Claws for the second time. On the 16th of April 2012, the Washington Wizards announced they would be signing Almond to contract for the rest of the 2011–12 season. At the end of the 2011–2012 season he was selected to the All NBA D-League Third Team after averaging 23.4 points and 6.0 rebounds per game for the Red Claws.

Almond briefly played for Crvena zvezda during the 2012–13 season. He then returned to the Maine Red Claws, who traded him to the Iowa Energy.

On January 30, 2013, he and Mike Taylor were traded to the Los Angeles D-Fenders in exchange for Jarrid Famous.

Post-professional career
Almond has since retired from professional basketball. He formed Almond Athletics, a non-profit organization, in 2013.

NBA career statistics

Regular season 

|-
| align="left" | 
| align="left" | Utah
| 9 || 0 || 4.3 || .267 || .250 || .667 || .2 || .3 || .1 || .0 || 1.4
|-
| align="left" | 
| align="left" | Utah
| 25 || 1 || 10.2 || .407 || .294 || .808 || 1.4 || .3 || .2 || .2 || 3.7
|-
| align="left" | 
| align="left" | Washington
| 4 || 0 || 16.8 || .353 || .333 || .333 || 2.0 || .5 || 1.8 || .0 || 3.5
|-
| align="left" | Career
| align="left" | 
| 38 || 1 || 9.5 || .381 || .292 || .743 || 1.2 || .3 || .3 || .1 || 3.1

Notes

External links

 
 Official Rice bio
 Morris Almond named AP All America Honorable Mention
 NBA D-League Profile
 Morris Almond moves to Real Madrid

1985 births
Living people
ABA League players
American expatriate basketball people in Italy
American expatriate basketball people in Serbia
American expatriate basketball people in Spain
American expatriate basketball people in Ukraine
American men's basketball players
Basketball players from Georgia (U.S. state)
BC Cherkaski Mavpy players
Iowa Energy players
KK Crvena zvezda players
Liga ACB players
Los Angeles D-Fenders players
Maine Red Claws players
People from Dalton, Georgia
Real Madrid Baloncesto players
Rice Owls men's basketball players
Shooting guards
Springfield Armor players
Utah Flash players
Utah Jazz draft picks
Utah Jazz players
Victoria Libertas Pallacanestro players
Washington Wizards players